is a Japanese motorcycle racer.

Career statistics

Grand Prix motorcycle racing

By season

Races by year
(key)

References

External links
 Profile on MotoGP.com

1984 births
Living people
Japanese motorcycle racers
125cc World Championship riders